Waldemar Magunia (8 December 1902 - 16 February 1974) was the leader of the Sturmabteilung (SA) in East Prussia and Commissioner General in Kiev.

Life
Magunia was born in Königsberg (Prussia). A skilled baker and member of the Freikorps, he joined the Nazi Party in June 1921 and became the first leader of the SA in East Prussia. In 1933 he was elected to the Reichstag and became President of the Handwerkskammer (Chamber of Skilled Crafts) for East Prussia, Head of the Landeshandwerksmeister (Society of professional handicraft workers) of Königsberg and NSDAP Gau Economic Advisor in East Prussia. Re-elected to the Reichstag in 1936 and 1938 he also served as Gauobmann (District Leader) of the German Labor Front (DAF) in East Prussia from 1937 to 1941.

From August 1941 to January 1942 he served as head of the civil administration in Bezirk Bialystok and as Deputy to the East Prussian Gauleiter, Erich Koch. Finally, on 14 February 1942, he was appointed the General Commissioner for the General District of Kiev of the Reichskommissariat Ukraine and SA-Oberführer in the Reichskommissariat Ukraine.

After 1945 Magunia was a manager at a firm in Oldenburg in Holstein. In 1957, Waldemar Magunia was a Bundestag candidate for the German Reich Party.
He died on 16 February 1974 in Oldenburg in Holstein.

References
Ernst Klee: Das Personenlexikon zum Dritten Reich. Wer war was vor und nach 1945. Fischer Taschenbuch Verlag, Zweite aktualisierte Auflage, Frankfurt am Main 2005, S. 387.
Erich Stockhorst: 5000 Köpfe – Wer war was im Dritten Reich. Arndt, Kiel 2000, .

External links 
 - Waldemar Magunia in der Datenbank der Reichstagsabgeordneten

1902 births
1974 deaths
Politicians from Königsberg
People from East Prussia
Nazi Party politicians
Members of the Reichstag of Nazi Germany
Sturmabteilung officers
Reichskommissariat Ukraine
20th-century Freikorps personnel
Deutsche Reichspartei politicians